Blue Road is a live album by Canadian country rock group Blue Rodeo. It was released by Warner Music Canada on October 28, 2008.

Track listing
"5 Days In May" – 9:04
"Crying Over You" – 4:22
"Rebel" – 3:36
"Blue House" – 3:15
"3 Hours Away" – 3:53
"Try" – 3:38
"To Love Somebody" – 5:09
"Know Where You Go" – 5:06
"Tell Me Your Dream" – 2:38
"Bad Timing" – 4:58
"Losing You" – 4:13

References

2008 live albums
Blue Rodeo albums
Albums recorded at Massey Hall
Music of Toronto